Bicyclus ena, the grizzled bush brown, is a butterfly of the family Nymphalidae. It is found from KwaZulu-Natal to Eswatini, Mpumalanga, from Zimbabwe to Kenya and in Uganda.

The wingspan is 38–42 mm for males and 43–48 mm for females. There are two extended generations per year. The wet-season form is on wing in spring and summer and the dry-season form in autumn and winter.

The larvae probably feed on various Poaceae species.
During the dry seasons the wings of females begin to form conspicuous wing markings (eyespots) whereas in the wetter seasons they began to lose those markings.  Also in dry seasons, they have higher reproduction rates where the females have changes in their appearance and behavior.  For example, their body increases in size, their cryptic color pattern changes, and have reduced behavior patterns until it begins to rain.

References

Elymniini
Butterflies described in 1877
Butterflies of Africa
Taxa named by William Chapman Hewitson

3. Halali, S., Brakefield (el at.) (2020). To mate, or not to mate: The evolution of reproductive diapause facilitates insect radiation into African savannahs in the Late Miocene

4. WINDIG, J. J., BRAKEFIELD,(el at.) (1994). Seasonal polyphenism in the wild: Survey of wing patterns in five species of Bicyclus butterflies in Malawi.